Kayalethu Malotana (born 30 January 1976 in Lady Frere) is a South African former rugby union player, current coach & a Xhosa commentator in rugby. He was educated at Queen's College Boys' High School where he matriculated in 1994 and received honors for Rugby. Under his coaching career, he's coached the backline of the South African U20 Women's National team, the Lions and as of January 2020 was appointed as the head coach of the TUT Vikings.

Career
Debuting in Currie Cup for the Border Bulldogs, Malotana played his first Super Rugby season in 1999 for the Cats, currently Lions.

He played his only match for the Springboks against Spain in the 1999 Rugby World Cup, becoming the first black player to play in South Africa in this edition of the World Cup.

He ended his career in the Pirates, from Johannesburg. Later, in 2007, he was appointed as Development Officer for the Lions, thanks also to his fluency in English, Afrikaans, Xhosa, Zulu and Tswana.

In 2009, he became an assistant coach for the Lions, and in 2010, the backline coach of the South Africa women's Under-20 national team. In January 2020, he was appointed as head coach of the TUT Vikings rugby team. He was once also a head of rugby at his former school, Queen's College.

He's also well-known for commentating in isiXhosa alongside former rugby player Lonwabo Mtimka on SuperSport Rugby games.

Test history

See also
List of South Africa national rugby union players – Springbok no. 687

References

External links

1976 births
Living people
People from Emalahleni Local Municipality, Eastern Cape
Xhosa people
Lions (United Rugby Championship) players
South African rugby union coaches
South African rugby union players
Rugby union centres
South Africa international rugby union players
Rugby union players from the Eastern Cape
Alumni of Queen's College Boys' High School